Harutalcis fumigata is a moth in the family Geometridae. It is found in Taiwan.

References

Moths described in 1909
Ennominae
Moths of Taiwan